Bussian is a surname. Notable people with the surname include:

 Russell Bussian (born 1973), professional rugby league footballer 
 Peter Bussian (born 1962), American filmmaker, photographer, and visual media consultant